The Bethel Royals football program represents Bethel University of Arden Hills, Minnesota in college football. Bethel competes at the NCAA Division III level as members of the Minnesota Intercollegiate Athletic Conference (MIAC). The head coach of the Royals is Steve Johnson, who has held the position since 1989.

Bethel plays its home games at Royal Stadium, located on the campus in Arden Hills, Minnesota. Royal Stadium was built in 1995 and renovated in 2001 and 2021.

History 
Bethel has had 14 head coaches since organized football started in 1947 adopting the nickname "Royals". The winningest coach in program history is Steve Johnson with a 244–107–1 career record. He is currently ranked #38 in all time wins as a head coach in NCAA college football. On April 2, 2016, he was inducted into the Minnesota Football Coaches Hall of Fame.

Their biggest conference rival is St. John's University. Bethel defeated #2 ranked St. John's 28-24 on September 24, 2022 in Arden Hills. Bethel finished the 2022 season ranked #5 in the country. Bethel won 7 of the 8 meetings against St. John's between 2006-2013. 

Bethel has appeared in 2 Division III Final Four Playoffs (2007, 2010).

AFCA All-Americans

Allstate & AFCA Good Works Team

Hall of Fame

Coaching staff 
 Head Coach: Steve Johnson
 Offensive Coordinator/Quarterbacks: AJ Parnell
 Defensive Coordinator/Defensive Backs: Mike McElroy
 Offensive Line/Recruiting Coordinator: Chad Richards
 Defensive Line: Brady Bomsta
 Linebackers/Special Teams: Stephen Franklin
 Running Backs/Video Coordinator: Paul Swan
 Outside Linebackers: Tyler Krebs
 Cornerbacks: Brooks Byrd
 Wide Receivers: Matt Houston
 Offensive Assistant: Eric Tulberg

NFL Players 
Matt Eller, Defensive Line (2002) – Minnesota Vikings and Green Bay Packers
Cory Svihla, Linebacker (2010) – Minnesota Vikings
Mitch Elliot, Offensive Tackle (2011) – Minnesota Vikings
Seth Mathis, Linebacker (2013) – Minnesota Vikings
Mitch Hallstrom, Wide receiver (2013) – Minnesota Vikings
Dawson Brown, Defensive Back (2019) - Atlanta Falcons
Kyle Kilgore, Defensive Line (2019) – Minnesota Vikings

References

External links
 

 
American football teams established in 1947
1947 establishments in Minnesota